Colonel Muhammadu Abdullahi Wase (1948–June 1996) was a Nigerian military administrator. He was appointed by General Sani Abacha in December 1993 administering Kano State in Northern Nigeria from December 1993 to June 1996.

In June 1995, Colonel Wase said that Nigerians, more than ever before, required adequate positive enlightenment on the activities of government, and that media houses should shun irresponsible journalism, which tended to cause dissent.

He died in a plane crash in Jos in 1996.

References

Nigerian Army officers
1996 deaths
Governors of Kano State
1948 births
Victims of aviation accidents or incidents in Nigeria